Trimeresurus gumprechti, known commonly as Gumprecht's green pit viper, is a species of venomous pit viper in the family Viperidae. The species is endemic to Asia.

Geographic range
Trimeresurus gumprechti is found in southern China (Yunnan), Laos, Myanmar, Thailand, and Vietnam.

Taxonomy
Trimeresurus gumprechti was described as a new species in 2002 by: 
Dr. Patrick David of the Muséum national d'histoire naturelle,
Dr. Gernot Vogel of the Society for Southeast Asian Herpetology,
 of the Smithsonian Institution,
Dr. Nicolas Vidal of the Muséum national d'histoire naturelle.

Description
Trimeresurus gumprechti is strikingly bright green in color. A photo of this arboreal snake was chosen as the cover image of a 2008 report published by the World Wildlife Fund called "First Contact in the Greater Mekong: New Species Discoveries."

Reproduction
Trimeresurus gumprechti is viviparous.

Etymology
The specific name, gumprechti, is in honor of German herpetologist Andreas Gumprecht.

Gallery

References

Further reading
 (Trimeresurus gumprechti, new species).

External links

 Natural Treasures Discovered in the Greater Mekong

gumprechti
Snakes of Asia
Snakes of China
Reptiles of Laos
Reptiles of Myanmar
Reptiles of Thailand
Snakes of Vietnam
Reptiles described in 2002
Taxa named by Olivier Sylvain Gérard Pauwels